Mark Semyonovich Donskoy (–  21 March 1981) was a Soviet film director, screenwriter, and studio administrative head.

Biography 
Mark Donskoy was born in Odessa in a Jewish family. During the Civil War, he served in the Red Army (1921-1923), and was held captive by the White Russians for ten months. Freed and discharged from military service, he studied psychology and psychiatry at the Crimean Medical School. In 1925 he graduated from the legal department of the Faculty of Social Sciences of the Crimean M.V. Frunze University in Simferopol. He then worked in investigative bodies, in the Supreme Court of the Ukrainian SSR, and in the bar association. He released a collection of short stories about his life called “Prisoners” (1925).

Donskoy began his career in film in 1926. He worked in the script department, then as an assistant director in Moscow, later as an editing assistant in Leningrad. In 1935 he became the first Soviet dubbing director; he dubbed the American film “The Invisible Man”. In addition to subsequently directing numerous films, he also worked from time to time as a studio administrator: in 1938-1941, and in 1945-1955 he was the administrative director of Soyuzdetfilm's film studio in Moscow; in 1942-1945 and in 1955-1957 he was director of the Kiev film studio; after 1957, he was director and art director of the Maxim Gorky film studio where he mentored Ousmane Sembène.

His wife was the screenwriter Irina Borisovna Donskaya (1918-1983).

Selected filmography
 The Childhood of Maxim Gorky (1938)
 Gorky 2: My Apprenticeship (1939)
 Gorky 3: My Universities (1940)
 How the Steel Was Tempered (1942)
 Fighting Film Album 9 (1942) (aka Diary Of A Nazi)
 Rainbow (1944)
 The Taras Family (1945)
 Alitet Leaves for the Hills (1949)
 Mother (1955)
 At Great Cost/The Horse That Cried (1957)
 Foma Gordeyev (1959)
 A Mother's Heart (1965)

Honours and awards
 Stalin Prizes:
2nd class (1941) – for The Childhood of Maxim Gorky (1938) and People (1939)
1st class (1946) – for Rainbow (1943)
1st class (1948) – for Village Teacher (1947)
 USSR State Prize (1968) – for Heart Mother (1966)
 People's Artist of USSR (1966)
 Hero of Socialist Labour (1971)
 Two Orders of Lenin
 Order of the October Revolution (18 March 1981)
 Order of the Red Banner of Labour
 Highest Award of the American Film Critics Association 1944 – for Rainbow
 Award of Daily News – for best foreign film shown in the U.S. in 1944 (Rainbow)
 Grand Prize at the Venice Film Festival 1946 – for The Unvanquished
 Special prize of the Italian journalists Venice IFF 1948 – for My Universities
 Award for Best Director Film Festival in Paris 1949 – for The Country Teacher
 First Prize in Stockholm International Film Festival 1949 – for My Universities
 Prize R. Unningtona Edinburgh International Film Festival in 1955 – for The Childhood of Maxim Gorky, The People and My Universities
 Prize for best director at the Locarno International Film Festival 1960 – for Foma Gordeev
 Special Diploma in Karlovy Vary International Film Festival 1970 – for Rainbow

References

External links
 

1901 births
1985 deaths
Film people from Odesa
People from Odessky Uyezd
Jewish Ukrainian musicians
Soviet Jews
Communist Party of the Soviet Union members
Soviet film directors
Soviet screenwriters
Male screenwriters
Soviet military personnel of the Russian Civil War
People's Artists of the USSR
Recipients of the USSR State Prize
Stalin Prize winners
Heroes of Socialist Labour
Recipients of the Order of Lenin